The 1964–65 Alpha Ethniki was the 29th season of the highest football league of Greece. The season began on 17 September 1964 and ended on 7 November 1965 after the playing of the last relegation play-off match (last round of regular season were played on 27 June, replay of the Niki Volos-Panathinaikos match was played on 19 September and the relegation play-off was played in October-November). Panathinaikos won their second consecutive and eighth Greek title.

The point system was: Win: 3 points - Draw: 2 points - Loss: 1 point.

League table

Results

Top scorers

External links
Greek Wikipedia
Official Greek FA Site
Greek SuperLeague official Site
SuperLeague Statistics

Alpha Ethniki seasons
Greece
1964–65 in Greek football leagues